Alsophila glaucifolia, synonym Cyathea glauca, is a species of tree fern endemic to Réunion. Little is known about this species.

Habitat and related species
A. glaucifolia grows at higher altitudes and it is one of three species of tree fern that are indigenous to Réunion island. 
 Alsophila celsa (syn. Cyathea excelsa) which also occurs in Mauritius, grows at slightly lower altitudes (200-1700m). Like A. glaucifolia, its leaves are tripinnate, but the new fronds of A. celsa are scaleless; those of A. glaucifolia have red-brown scales. 
 Alsophila borbonica (syn. Cyathea borbonica) is the only species with bipinnate fronds.

References

External links 

glaucifolia
Ferns of Asia
Endemic flora of Réunion